Tunku Abdul Rahman formed the third Rahman cabinet after being invited by Tuanku Syed Putra to begin a new government following the 25 April 1964 general election in Malaysia. Prior to the election, Rahman led (as Prime Minister) the first Rahman cabinet, a coalition government that consisted of members of the component parties of Alliance Party. It was the 3rd cabinet of Malaysia formed since independence.

This is a list of the members of the third cabinet of the first Prime Minister of Malaysia, Tunku Abdul Rahman.

Composition

Full members
The federal cabinet consisted of the following ministers:

Assistant ministers

Composition before cabinet dissolution

Full members

Assistant ministers

See also
 Members of the Dewan Rakyat, 2nd Malaysian Parliament
 List of parliamentary secretaries of Malaysia#Third Rahman cabinet

References

Cabinet of Malaysia
1964 establishments in Malaysia
1969 disestablishments in Malaysia
Cabinets established in 1964
Cabinets disestablished in 1969